Dying to Divorce is a 2021 British documentary film directed by Chloe Fairweather. It was selected as the British entry for the Best International Feature Film at the 94th Academy Awards.

Synopsis
Ipek is part of a group of activists fighting to protect Turkish women against abuse and murder, by putting violent men behind bars. As femicides soar and Turkish society starts to fall apart, Ipek and her clients risk everything for their freedom.

More than one in three Turkish women have experienced domestic violence and the number of femicides is rising. But some Turkish women are fighting back. Ipek Bozkurt, a courageous lawyer, is determined to challenge this misogynistic trend by putting abusive men behind bars.

Reception
On Rotten Tomatoes, the documentary holds an approval rating of 100% based on 7 reviews, with an average rating of 7.5/10.

See also
 List of submissions to the 94th Academy Awards for Best International Feature Film
 List of British submissions for the Academy Award for Best International Feature Film

References

External links
 

2021 films
2021 documentary films
British documentary films
2020s Turkish-language films
2020s British films